Chryseobacterium shigense  is a Gram-negative, strictly aerobic, rod-shaped and non-motile bacteria from the genus of Chryseobacterium which has been isolated from a rainbow trout.

References

Further reading

External links
Type strain of Chryseobacterium shigense at BacDive -  the Bacterial Diversity Metadatabase

shigense
Bacteria described in 2005